Lucas Beltrán (born 29 March 2001) is an Argentine professional footballer who plays as a forward for River Plate.

Career
Beltrán began in the ranks of Instituto, departing in 2016 to sign for Argentine Primera División side River Plate. He made his professional debut on 2 December 2018 at the age of seventeen, appearing for the last seven minutes of a game against Gimnasia y Esgrima. He had previously been an unused substitute a week earlier versus Aldosivi on 27 October.

On 15 July 2021, Beltrán joined Colón on a dry loan until the end of 2022.

Career statistics
.

References

External links

2001 births
Living people
Footballers from Córdoba, Argentina
Argentine footballers
Association football forwards
Argentine Primera División players
Club Atlético River Plate footballers
Club Atlético Colón footballers